{{Infobox football club season
| club               = Hertha BSC
| season             = 2011–12
| manager            = Michael Skibbe Otto Rehhagel
| mgrtitle           = Manager
| chairman           = Werner Gegenbauer
| chrtitle           = President
| league             = Bundesliga
| league result      = 16th (relegated)
| cup1               = DFB-Pokal
| cup1 result        = Quarter-finals
| league topscorer   = Pierre-Michel Lasogga(8 goals)
| season topscorer   = Pierre-Michel Lasogga(10 goals)
| highest attendance = 74,244 vs. Bayern Munich
| lowest attendance  = 36,997 vs. Hannover 96| average attendance = 53,449
| pattern_la1 = _hertha_1112h
| pattern_b1  = _hertha_1112h
| pattern_ra1 = _hertha_1112h
| pattern_sh1 = _hertha_1112h
| pattern_so1 = _hertha_1112h
| leftarm1    = 000037
| body1       = 000037
| rightarm1   = 000037
| shorts1     = 000037
| socks1      = 000037
| pattern_la2 = _hbsc1011h
| pattern_b2  = _hertha_1011h
| pattern_ra2 = _hbsc1011h
| pattern_sh2 = 
| pattern_so2 = _whitetop
| leftarm2    = 0000FF
| body2       = 0000FF 
| rightarm2   = 0000FF
| shorts2     = 0000FF 
| socks2      = 0000FF
| pattern_la3 = _barnsley1112h
| pattern_b3  = _barnsley1112h
| pattern_ra3 = _barnsley1112h
| pattern_sh3 = _hbsc1011a
| pattern_so3 = _redtop
| leftarm3    = FF2400
| body3       = FFFFFF
| rightarm3   = FF2400
| shorts3     = 000000
| socks3      = 000000
| prevseason         = 2010–11
| nextseason         = 2012–13
}}

The 2010–11 season of Hertha BSC began on 31 July 2011 with a DFB-Pokal match against ZFC Meuselwitz, and ended on 15 May 2012 with the second leg of the Bundesliga relegation play-offs. For the first time since 2006–07, Hertha made it past the 2nd round of the DFB-Pokal, making it as far as the quarterfinals before losing to Borussia Mönchengladbach. In the Bundesliga, Hertha finished 16th, qualifying for the relegation play-off.

Review and events

Overview of season
On 18 December, Hertha BSC fired head coach Markus Babbel after a disagreement with Michael Preetz. Preetz fired Babbel because there is no trust and so the club can "avert damage". Babbel he told Preetz that he would not sign a contract extension during the November international break while Preetz claim Babbel told him on 13 December. Babbel responded to Pretz's claim by stating that "when someone has another opinion, then maybe he wasn't listening properly". On 22 December, Michael Skibbe was named Babbel's replacement. On 12 February, Hertha BSC fired Skibbe after losing all 5 matches in charge.

Hertha BSC vs. Fortuna Düsseldorf

The matches
Fortuna Düsseldorf won a spot in the promotion/relegation playoff against first division side Hertha BSC.

First leg
Going into the playoff, Fortuna Düsseldorf hadn't been in the top flight for 15 seasons. They won the first leg against Hertha BSC 1:2 in Berlin's Olympic Stadium from goals from Thomas Bröker and an own goal from Hertha BSC's Adrián Ramos.

Second leg
In the return leg in Düsseldorf, North Rhine-Westphalia, both teams drew 2-2. Fortuna Düsseldorf won on aggregate 4–3. However, the second half was marred by trouble. Hertha BSC supporter threw flares onto the field. Hertha BSC supporters did this after Fortuna Düsseldorf scored their second goal of the night to lead 2–1. The other problem of the night was when several Fortuna Düsseldorf supporters ran onto the field with about a minute left. It took 21 minutes to restore order and stoppage time ended up being 28 minutes by the time the final whistle blew. With Fortuna Düsseldorf winning the 2 legged affair, they returned to the Bundesliga after 15 seasons.

The appeal
Hertha BSC appealed the result of the match. The German Football Association will be meeting on 18 May 2012 to discuss the incidents of the second leg. Campino, singer for Die Toten Hosen, called Hertha BSC's protest "indecent". The hearing at the German Football Association last for six hours. The panel's decision will not be known until a further meeting on Monday. It is expected to make a decision at 15:00 CET. The German Football Association stated that any possible disciplinary action against either club or any of the players will be taken at a later date. The players being investigated are Levan Kobiashvili, Christian Lell, Thomas Kraft and Andre Mijatović. 2nd leg referee Wolfgang Stark was a key witness at the first hearing at the German Football Association.

Sports law expert Michael Lehner said that Hertha BSC can hope for replay after the second leg of the promotion/relegation playoff. Lehner went on to state, "Is not the game has been properly placed on the principle of equal opportunity at the end there was a break in terms of game development" and "The team of Hertha BSC through the fault of third parties a real opportunity has been deprived of the game even. get why there should be a replay from a legal point of view".

The sports court of the German Football Association rejected the appeal of Hertha BSC. Hertha BSC will pay the cost of the proceedings. Hertha BSC appealed the decision of the German Football Association's sports court. The sports German Football Association court president Hans Eberhard Lorenz stated, "The appeal was unsuccessful, because no ground of opposition was to prove the referee has traded at any time conform to the rules, and the alleged Hertha BSC-sided weakness due to the interruption could not be proven.." He also stated that "There was no Berlin players injured or assaulted or were needed to be replaced. Had this been the case, the objection would have been done." The Federal Court of the German Football Association confirmed the Sports Court decision. Hertha BSC can appeal the decision to the Sports Court for Arbitration. After the final verdict, Hertha BSC players went on vacation while Fortuna Düsseldorf players were not immediately released for vacation.

The disciplinary panel of the German Football Association decided that Fortuna Düsseldorf must play their first home match of next season with no fans for the fans running onto the field during the 2nd leg of the promotion/relegation playoff. The club was also hit with a six figure fine.

Other incidents
Another incident reported by Die Welt the next day was that Hertha BSC players attacked second leg referee Wolfgang Stark. Stark pressed charges against an unknown player for assaulting him off the field. Hertha BSC have apologized for the conduct of some of the club's players. The four players are accused of verbally and physically harassing the referee. The German Football Association (DFB) handed down suspensions for Levan Kobiashvili, who was banned for a year, Christian Lell, who was banned for six matches, Thomas Kraft, who was banned for five matches and Andre Mijatović, who was banned for four matches. Kobiashvili's suspension was reduced to seven and a half months and Lell's ban was eventually reduced to 5 matches.

Match results

Legend

BundesligaNote: Results are given with Hertha BSC score listed first. Relegation play-off 
As 16th-placed team, Hertha BSC faces the 3rd-placed 2011–12 2. Bundesliga side in a two-legged play-off. The winner on aggregate score after both matches will earn a spot in the 2012–13 Bundesliga.

Dates and times of these matches were determined by the Deutsche Fußball-Liga as following:

DFB-PokalNote: Results are given with Hertha BSC score listed first.Player information

Roster and statistics

Roster, goals and appearances

|}

Disciplinary action
 Disciplinary records for 2011–12 league matches. Players with 1 card or more included only. Last updated on 5 May 2012''

Summer Transfers

In:

Out:

Winter transfers

In:

Out:

See also
2011–12 Bundesliga
2011–12 DFB-Pokal
Hertha BSC

Sources

Hertha BSC seasons
Hertha BSC